The Mixed 10 m platform synchro competition of the 2020 European Aquatics Championships was held on 11 May 2021.

Results
The final was started at 19:30.

References

Mixed 10 m platform synchro
European Aquatics Championships